Gambling is a 1929 play by George M. Cohan.

After initial performances in Philadelphia, Atlantic City, New Jersey and Brooklyn, the play opened at the Fulton Theatre on Broadway from August 26, 1929 until January 1930, for 152 performances.   It was made into a movie in 1934.

Broadway cast
Harry Lillford as Sheridan
Harold Healy as Connelly
George M. Cohan as Draper
Robert Middlemass as Freelock
Dan Carey as Lewis
Neil Stone as Carlysle
Isabel Baring as Dorothy
Douglas McPherson as Braddock
Mary Philips as Mazie
Charles Johnson as Brennan
Kathleen Niday as Marie
Theodore Newton as Gaylor
Ernest Fox as Martin
Mark Sullivan as Mason
William Gillard as Buddy
Mary Fox as Maid
Jack Williams as Captain
Jack Leslie as Knowles
Duke Keeley as Wayne
Joseph Halsey as Attendant
Irving Jackson as Messenger
Lydia McMillan as Mrs. Cromley
Edward F. Namary as Chief
Jane Thomas as Miss Daly

References

External links
 
  (archive)

1929 plays
Plays by George M. Cohan